The UEFA European Under-18 Championship 1980 Final Tournament was held in East Germany. It also served as the European qualification for the 1981 FIFA World Youth Championship.

Qualification

Group 1

Other groups

|}

Teams
The following teams qualified for the tournament:

 
  (host)

Squads

Group stage

Group A

Group B

Group C

Group D

Semifinals

Third place match

Final

Qualification to World Youth Championship
The six best performing teams qualified for the 1981 FIFA World Youth Championship: four semifinalists and the best group runners-up (based on points and goal difference).

 (replaced , declining participation)

 (won draw against )

External links
Results by RSSSF

UEFA European Under-19 Championship
1980
Under-18
Under-18
May 1980 sports events in Europe
Sports competitions in East Germany
1980 in youth association football